The Rossel cicadabird (Edolisoma rostratum) is a species of bird in the family Campephagidae that is endemic to Rossel Island in Papua New Guinea. It was recently reclassified from a subspecies of the slender-billed cicadabird to its own individual species.

References

Edolisoma